Kawnro is a town in north-east Myanmar near the border with Yunnan province of west China.

Populated places in Kachin State